Ana Victoria García Pérez, known as Vickiana (born July 15, 1954, in Santiago, Dominican Republic) is a singer, vedette and television presenter. The producer and host of the television program "Vickiana, the forbidden" (Vickiana, lo prohibido) became very popular in music since 1980.  A diabetic, she suffered a myocardial infarction in 1999 and a diabetic coma in 2011.

Discography
 Jardin Prohibido, 1981
 Te Invito,1983
 Derriteme, 1985
 Vickiana, 1989
 Mas que Amor, 1991
 Amargada, 1995
 Infiel, 1997
 En calor, 2000
 Disco de Oro de Vickiana

References

1954 births
Vedettes (cabaret)
People from Santiago de los Caballeros
20th-century Dominican Republic women singers
Dominican Republic television presenters
Living people
Dominican Republic women television presenters